Sebastian Werle (born 23 December 1984) is a retired German international rugby union player, having last playing for the RG Heidelberg in the Rugby-Bundesliga and the German national rugby union team.

Werle has played rugby since 1988.

He made his last appearance for Germany against the Netherlands on 28 April 2007.

Honours

Club
 German rugby union championship
 Champions: 2006, 2007
 Runners up: 2008

National team
 European Nations Cup - Division 2
 Champions: 2008

Stats
Sebastian Werle's personal statistics in club and international rugby:

Club

 As of 30 April 2012

National team

European Nations Cup

Friendlies & other competitions

 As of 25 March 2010

References

External links
   Sebastian Werle at totalrugby.de

1984 births
Living people
German rugby union players
Germany international rugby union players
RG Heidelberg players
Rugby union locks